This is a list of butterflies of Tonga.

Hesperiidae

Coeliadinae
Badamia exclamationis (Fabricius, 1775)

Pieridae

Coliadinae
Eurema hecabe sulphurata  (Butler, 1875)
Eurema brigitta australis  (Wallace, 1867)

Pierinae
Appias athama manaia  (Hopkins, 1927)
Belenois java schmeltzi  Hopkins, 1927

Lycaenidae

Theclinae
Deudorix epijarbas armstrongi Hopkins, 1927

Polyommatinae
Jamides morphoides  Butler, 1884
Jamides carissima thomasi  Miller & Miller, 1993
Catochrysops taitensis hopkinsi  Miller & Miller, 1993
Lampides boeticus  (Linnaeus, 1767)
Famegana alsulus lulu  (Mathew, 1889)
Zizina labradus mangoensis  (Butler, 1884)
Euchrysops cnejus samoa  (Herrich-Schaeffer, 1869)

Nymphalidae

Danainae
Tirumala hamata angustata  (Moore, 1883)
Danaus plexippus plexippus  (Linnaeus, 1758)
Euploea tulliolus forsteri  (C & R Felder, 1865)
Euploea lewinii lewinii  C & R Felder, 1865

Satyrinae
Melanitis leda solandra  (Fabricius, 1775)

Nymphalinae
Doleschallia tongana tongana  (Hopkins, 1927)
Hypolimnas antilope lutescens  (Butler, 1874)
Hypolimnas bolina pallescens  (Butler, 1874)
Junonia villida villida  (Fabricius, 1787)

Heliconiinae
Vagrans egista bowdenia  (M. R. Butler, 1874)

Acraeinae
Acraea andromacha polynesiaca  Rebel, 1910

References
W.John Tennent: A checklist of the butterflies of Melanesia, Micronesia, Polynesia and some adjacent areas. Zootaxa 1178: 1-209 (21 Apr. 2006)

Tonga
Tonga
Butterflies
Tonga
Tonga